Robert Douglas Fyfe (25 September 1930 – 15 September 2021) was a Scottish actor, best known for his role as Howard in the long-running British sitcom Last of the Summer Wine from 1985 to 2010.

Early life
Fyfe was born in Kirkcaldy on 25 September 1930, the son of Douglas Fyfe, a watchmaker, and Mary Fyfe née Irvine. He attended Kirkcaldy High School, before studying English literature at Edinburgh University.  He did not complete his degree and instead trained under Esmé Church at the Northern Theatre School in Bradford, graduating in 1954. Whilst studying, he performed in Halifax, York and Scarborough, including appearing in the York Mystery Plays in 1954.

Career
Fyfe appeared in the films Xtro, The 51st State, Around the World in 80 Days, Gaolbreak and Babel. In 2012 he appeared in Cloud Atlas. Other credits include guest appearances on Z-Cars, Survivors, The Gentle Touch, The Return of Sherlock Holmes and Monarch of the Glen. Fyfe appeared as Malcolm Lagg, a lollipop man, in Coronation Street in December 2012. His character was seen training Dennis Tanner, played by Philip Lowrie, to take over his job.

Personal life
He married stage director Diana Rush in 1957. She died in August 2021.  Fyfe died from kidney disease on 15 September 2021, at the age of 90. They were survived by their three sons, Timothy, Nicholas and Dominic.

Filmography

Film

Television roles

References

External links
 Robert Fyfe at BFI
 
 

1930 births
2021 deaths
British male comedy actors
People from Kirkcaldy
Scottish male film actors
Scottish male television actors
20th-century Scottish male actors
21st-century Scottish male actors
People educated at Kirkcaldy High School
Deaths from kidney disease